Super Fight League has scheduled several fights cards throughout 2014 to 2016:

List of events

Event summaries

SFL - Warriors
SFL Warriors took place on March 30, 2014 in Mumbai, India. As with the previous events, it was streamed on YouTube, on TEN Sports in India and on the Fight Network in Canada.

Fight Card

Sources

SFL 35
SFL 35 took place on October 4, 2014 in Tacoma, Washington, USA. As with the previous events, it was streamed on YouTube, on TEN Sports in India and on the Fight Network in Canada.

Background

This was the inaugural event in the United States of America.

Fight Card

Sources

SFL 36
SFL 36: America 2 took place on December 13, 2014 in Tacoma, Washington, USA. As with the previous events, it was streamed on YouTube, on TEN Sports in India and on the Fight Network in Canada.

Background

This was the 2nd event in the United States of America.

Fight Card

Sources

SFL 37
SFL 37: America 3 took place on February 21, 2015 in Tacoma, Washington, USA. As with the previous events, it was streamed on YouTube, on TEN Sports in India and on the Fight Network in Canada.

Background

This was the 3rd event in the United States of America.

Fight Card

Sources

SFL 38
SFL 38: India vs. Pakistan took place on February 27, 2015 in the United Arab Emirates. As with the previous events, it was streamed on YouTube, on TEN Sports in India and on the Fight Network in Canada.

Background
This was the very first MMA event to feature fighters from India against fighters from Pakistan, standing from the long rivalry both nations have. It was also the first event the SFL hosted in the United Arab Emirates. Team India beat Team Pakistan by 6-1 & won the SFL Cup.

Fight Card

Sources

SFL 39
SFL 39: BodyPower Expo took place on March 22, 2015 in Mumbai, India. As with the previous events, it will be streamed on YouTube, on TEN Sports in India and on the Fight Network in Canada.

Fight Card

Sources

SFL 40
SFL 40: America 4 took place on April 25, 2015 in Tacoma, Washington. As with the previous events, it will be streamed on YouTube, on TEN Sports in India and on the Fight Network in Canada.

Fight Card

Sources

SFL 41
SFL 41: America 5 took place on July 11, 2015 in Tacoma, Washington. As with the previous events, it was streamed on YouTube, on TEN Sports in India and on the Fight Network in Canada.

Fight Card

Sources

SFL 42
SFL 42: Fight Night at the Corral took place on August 15, 2015 in Calgary, Alberta. This was the Canadian debut event for Super Fight League. As with the previous events, it was streamed on YouTube, on TEN Sports in India and on the Fight Network in Canada.

Fight Card

Sources

SFL 43
SFL 43: Capital Collision took place on September 26, 2015 in Gurgaon, India. As with the previous events, it was streamed on YouTube, on TEN Sports in India and on the Fight Network in Canada.

Fight Card

Sources

SFL 44
SFL 44: America 6 took place on September 26, 2015 in Tacoma, Washington, USA. As with the previous events, it was streamed on YouTube, on TEN Sports in India and on the Fight Network in Canada.

Fight Card

Sources

SFL 45
SFL 45: America 7 took place on December 12, 2015 in Tacoma, Washington, USA. As with the previous events, it was streamed on YouTube, on TEN Sports in India and on the Fight Network in Canada.

Fight Card

Sources

SFL 46
SFL 46: America 8 took place on February 20, 2016 in Tacoma, Washington, USA. As with the previous events, it was streamed on YouTube, on TEN Sports in India and on the Fight Network in Canada.

Fight Card

Sources

SFL 47
SFL 47 took place on March 18, 2016 in New Delhi, India. As with the previous events, it was streamed on YouTube, on TEN Sports in India and on the Fight Network in Canada.

Fight Card

Sources

SFL 48
SFL 48 took place on March 26, 2016 in Pune, India. As with the previous events, it was streamed on YouTube, on TEN Sports in India and on the Fight Network in Canada.

Fight Card

Sources

SFL 49
SFL 49: America 9 (Seattle vs. Portland) took place on May 7, 2016 in Tacoma, Washington, USA. As with the previous events, it was streamed on YouTube, on TEN Sports in India and on the Fight Network in Canada.

Fight Card

Sources

SFL 50
SFL 50: America 10 (Seattle vs. Los Angeles) took place on July 23, 2016 in Tacoma, Washington, USA. As with the previous events, it was streamed on YouTube, on TEN Sports in India and on the Fight Network in Canada.

Fight Card

Sources

SFL 51
SFL 51: America 11 (Seattle Warriors vs. Central Valley Heat) took place on October 22, 2016 in Tacoma, Washington, USA. As with the previous events, it was streamed on YouTube, on TEN Sports in India and on the Fight Network in Canada.

Fight Card

Sources

SFL 53: Cage Sport 43
SFL 53: Cage Sport 43 took place on December 17, 2016 in Tacoma, Washington, USA. As with the previous events, it was streamed on YouTube, on TEN Sports in India and on the Fight Network in Canada.

Fight Card

Sources

References

External links
 Super Fight League official site

SFL

SFL
Mixed martial arts events